Vila Baleira is the main city in the municipality of Porto Santo, located on Porto Santo Island, Madeira, Portugal. It was made a city on 7 August 1996.

References 

Porto Santo Island
Populated places in Madeira

Trivia 

Christopher Columbus is to have married his wife and Portuguese Noblewoman Filipa Moniz Perestrelo here, in 1479 at Vila Baliera